The Mississippi Valley Conference (MVC) is a high school athletic conference in southwest Wisconsin.  All MVC schools are members of the Wisconsin Interscholastic Athletic Association (WIAA), and are located in the La Crosse, Wisconsin metropolitan area.

History
The MVC was formed in 1989. To accommodate for the growing attendance in schools in traditional rural-based conferences, and to accommodate for travel purposes, the MVC was formed originally by taking teams from three established conferences. Holmen and Onalaska were taken from the Coulee Conference, Tomah and Sparta from the South Central Conference, and La Crosse Central High School and Logan High School from the Big Rivers Conference. Shortly after, in 1997, Aquinas High School joined from the Central Wisconsin Catholic Conference of the Wisconsin Independent Schools Athletic Association, a private school athletic league, to become the seventh member.

In 2014, West Salem began competition in the Mississippi Valley Conference for football only. They remain in the Coulee Conference for all other sports. Due to their weak football program, Aquinas' football team will compete in the Coulee Conference beginning 2020, though its other teams will remain in the MVC.

Sports
The MVC sponsors 19 varsity sports. They are:

 Fall: Football, boys' soccer, girls' tennis, volleyball, boys' cross country, girls' cross country and girls' golf
 Winter: Boys' basketball, girls' basketball, gymnastics, wrestling boys' hockey.
 Spring: Boys' track, girls' track, boys' golf, boys' tennis, girls' soccer, baseball and softball.

Schools

|-
|Reedsburg Area School District
|Reedsburg, WI
|2022
|Public
|
|Beavers
|Navy Blue and White
|}

Affiliated Members

All Sports
Nineteen varsity sports count towards the Mississippi Valley Conference "All Sports Award." Points are awarded based on a team's finish in a given sport (seven for the conference championship, six for second place and so on to one point for the seventh-place finisher). At the completion of each sport season (fall, winter and spring), updated standings are posted on the league's Web site, and at the end of the school year, the school with the most points is declared the winner of the "All Sports Award."

Rivalries
The Mississippi Valley Conference has a number of intense rivalries, both based on proximity, and performance.

City
 Central Vs. Logan - The two La Crosse public schools intense rivalry is well publicized by local media, and is highlighted by football's Battle for the Ark of Victory.
 Central Vs. Aquinas - A heated battle for city supremacy, and the overall city championship.
 Logan Vs. Aquinas - A heated battle for city supremacy, and the overall city championship.

Other Main Rivalries
 Holmen Vs. Onalaska - Proximity spices up this rivalry, as the two school districts overlap city boundaries. Both schools also came over from the Coulee Conference together.
 Tomah Vs. Sparta - Both came over from the South Central Conference, and are separated by 17 miles of Interstate 90.  The closest conference foe for both teams.

 Reedsburg  Vs. Baraboo - Both moved to the MVC from the badger conference have one of the longest rivalries in the state.

Additionally to these main rivalries, many other rivalries have developed based on different sports and success.  In the early 2000s, Holmen and Aquinas had fierce competitions in boys basketball in which tickets were sold out days after going on sale.  Additionally, in the early 1990s, Onalaska Vs. Central was a heated matchup in Boys Basketball.  That rivalry was rekindled in the 2010s as both teams regularly competed for state bids.  In wrestling, Holmen Vs. Sparta and Holmen Vs. Tomah have come and gone.  In Ice Hockey, Onalaska and Aquinas/Holmen/G-E-T/C-FC hold a battle for the Omni Center rivalry, as both teams play in the same venue.

Many non-conference rivalries are also in the MVC.  Onalaska Vs. West Salem, Logan and Central Vs. Eau Claire Memorial and North, Tomah Vs. Black River Falls, and Holmen Vs. G-E-T are all annual football games.  Aquinas maintains matchups with old conference members from their WISAA days.

Rivalry Week
In many different sports, particularly but not limited to football, basketball, and wrestling, the three big rivalries will frequently be played on the same days, coining the phrase Rivalry Week in football and Rivalry Night in other sports.  These rivalries are Central Vs. Logan, Holmen Vs. Onalaska, and Sparta Vs. Tomah.  Occasionally, Aquinas will be inserted into a city match up or against Holmen or Onalaska on a Rivalry Night.

References

External links
MVC website

Wisconsin high school sports conferences
High school sports conferences and leagues in the United States
Supraorganizations